Narimi Arimori (有森 也実 Arimori Narimi, born 10 December 1967 in Yokohama, Japan) is a Japanese actress.

Filmography

Film
Hoshizora no Mukō no Kuni (1986) – Risa
Final Take (1986) – Koharu Tanaka
Tora-san's Bluebird Fantasy (1986) – A Tourist
Komori Seikatsu Kojo Club (2008) – Taeko Komori
Inumukoiri (2017) – Azusa Ninomiya
The Land Beyond the Starry Sky (2021) – Risa's mother
 Tenjō no Hana (2022)
 Goldfish (2023)
 Single 8 (2023), Hiroshi's mother

Television
Tokyo Love Story (1991) – Satomi Sekiguchi
Hideyoshi (1996) – Tsumaki Hiroko
Minami-kun no Koibito (2015)

Awards and prizes

References

External links
Official Site (in Japanese)

JMDb Profile (in Japanese)

1967 births
Living people
Japanese actresses
People from Yokohama